Kolossi Castle is a former Crusader stronghold on the south-west edge of Kolossi village  west of the city of Limassol on the island of Cyprus. It held great strategic importance in the Middle Ages, and contained large facilities for the production of sugar from the local sugarcane, one of Cyprus's main exports in the period. The original castle was possibly built in 1210 by the Frankish military, when the land of Kolossi was given by King Hugh I to the Knights of the Order of St John of Jerusalem (Hospitallers).

The present castle was built in 1454 by the Hospitallers under the Commander of Kolossi, Louis de Magnac, whose coat-of-arms can be seen carved into the castle's walls.

Owing to rivalry among the factions in the Crusader Kingdom of Cyprus, the castle was taken by the Knights Templar in 1306, but returned to the Hospitallers in 1313 following the abolition of the Templars.

As well as for its sugar, the area is also known for its sweet wine, Commandaria.  At the wedding banquet after King Richard the Lionheart's marriage to Berengaria of Navarre at nearby Limassol, he allegedly declared it to be the "wine of kings and the king of wines."  It has been produced in the region for millennia, and is thought to be the oldest continually-produced and named wine in the world, known for centuries as "Commandaria" after the Templars' Grand Commandery there.

In literature
Kolossi Castle appears in many works of fiction, including La milicia de Dios by the Spanish writer Eduardo García-Ontiveros Cerdeño. It also appears in Snow Wasted by the Cypriot author Matthew Malekos and in the novels of several British writers, including Race of Scorpions: The House of Noccolo by Dorothy Dunnett, In Search of Sixpence by Michael Paraskos and Lionheart by  Stewart Binns.

Gallery

References

Buildings and structures completed in 1454
Crusader castles
Castles in Cyprus
Castles and fortifications of the Knights Hospitaller
Kolossi